Miss Nederland is a national Beauty pageant in the Netherlands. The pageant was founded in 1929 in Amsterdam, where the winners were sent to Miss Universe.

History

Former pageant
From 1929 to 1931, the Netherlands held a national pageant in Amsterdam for the first time called "Miss Holland". From 1932 to 1949 the pageant was briefly discontinued and later recommenced in 1951 by the Miss Holland Organization.

In 1951 the Netherlands debuted at the Miss World pageant and the Miss Universe pageant in 1956. The national beauty pageant was called "Miss Holland" from 1950 until 1990, since that year the winner competed at the Miss Universe, while runners-up traditionally competed at the Miss World pageant and the Miss International pageant. Since 1991 it became known as "Miss Nederland" whose winner went on to the Miss World pageant. From 1991 to 2008 the Miss Universe representatives were selected from "Miss Universe Netherlands" pageant. The program was televised live on Veronica television.

Organizers
1929–1976 — “Het Leven” (the Life)
1977–1978 — Corinne Rottschaefer (De Telegraph)
1989–2008 — Hans Konings(CEO) Miss Nederland 0rganisatie in cooperation with RTL4 and SBS6
1991–1994 — Miss Universe Nederland by Veronica TV
2009–2019 — Kim Kotter
2020–Present — Monica van Ee (Hannah)

Miss Nederland Organisation
In 2009, Kim Kötter became the national director of the Netherlands. She competed at the Miss Universe 2002 in San Juan, Puerto Rico. Usually, the Miss Nederland titleholder will compete at both the Miss Universe and the Miss World pageant. In 2013, two winners were crowned as the Miss Netherlands Universe and Miss Netherlands World pageant to represent their country at the Miss Universe and Miss World pageants, respectively. In 2016, the Miss Nederland only had the Miss Universe franchise.

Titleholders 
The magazine “Het Leven” (the Life) organised the first Miss Holland pageant. The winners of Miss Holland between 1929 and 1935 attended International Pageant of Pulchritude (Miss Universe) in Galveston, USA. Later from 1991 to 2008 the Miss Universe Nederland pageant was broadcast live on Veronica television. In 2009 Kim Kötter got also the right to send a girl to the Miss World pageant. She also took over the Miss Nederland franchise. Since that year Miss Nederland winner goes to Miss Universe pageant.

Results

Titleholders under Miss Nederland org.

Miss Universe Nederland

The winner of Miss Nederland former: "Miss Holland" represents her country at the Miss Universe pageant. On occasion, when the winner does not qualify (due to age) for either contest, a runner-up is sent.

Past titleholders under Miss Nederland org.

Miss World Nederland

Between 1951-1990 Netherlands was competed at the Miss World contest by Miss Holland 1st Runner-up or sometimes, Winner. While in 1991-2008 the Miss Netherlands selected the official candidate to the Miss World pageant. Between 1990 and 2008 Miss World Netherlands had selected by Miss Netherlands (Another agency Hans Konings). Between 2009 and 2015 Miss Nederland by Kim Kotter selects a runner-up to Miss World. Since 2016 the Miss World Netherlands is holding an official pageant to select a national winner for Miss World. The new franchise holder in the Netherlands, Katia Maes produced several successful Dutch young women in different pageants worldwide.

See also
Miss International Netherlands

References

External links 
 Miss Nederland

 
Netherlands
Beauty pageants in the Netherlands
Recurring events established in 1956
1956 establishments in the Netherlands
Dutch awards